The 2009 Atlantic 10 Conference Baseball Championship was held from May 20 through 23 at Fifth Third Field in Dayton, OH. It featured the top six regular-season finishers of the conference's 14 teams. Third-seeded Xavier defeated Rhode Island in the title game to win the tournament for the first time, earning the A-10's automatic bid to the 2009 NCAA Tournament.

Seeding and format 
The league's top six teams, based on winning percentage in the 27-game regular-season schedule, were seeded one through six. The top two seeds, Dayton and Rhode Island, received byes into the second round of play in the double elimination tournament.

In the three-way tie for fourth-place, the conference's tiebreaking procedures gave Massachusetts the fourth seed, Fordham the fifth, and Charlotte the sixth.

Bracket

All-Tournament Team 
The following players were named to the All-Tournament Team. Xavier's Billy O'Conner, one of six Musketeers selected, was named Most Outstanding Player.

Xavier's Jordan Conley and Charlotte's Rob Lyerly, both selected in 2008, were second-time selections.

References 

Tournament
Atlantic 10 Conference Baseball Tournament
Atlantic 10 Conference baseball tournament
Atlantic 10 Conference baseball tournament
Baseball in Dayton, Ohio
College baseball tournaments in Ohio
Sports competitions in Dayton, Ohio